William Andrew Thomas Beer (born 8 October 1988) is an English cricketer. Primarily a leg break bowler, he currently plays for Sussex County Cricket Club and Horsham.  He mainly plays one day cricket.

Promoted from Sussex's youth academy at the end of 2007, Beer made his first-class debut in the season's opening game against Marylebone Cricket Club. Bowling five overs, Beer took one wicket in the MCC's only innings of the match, that of Surrey's Arun Harinath. He also made four appearances in the 2008 Twenty20 Cup, where he took three wickets.

References

External links

1988 births
Living people
English cricketers
Sussex cricketers
Sportspeople from Crawley
Oxfordshire cricketers